Hnylyi Tikych, also known as Gniloy Tikich River, is a river in Ukraine, 157 km in length, a tributary of the Tikych, in the basin of Southern Bug. The Hnylyi Tikych river finds its source near the village of Snizhky in Bila Tserkva Raion, Kyiv Oblast.

It joins the Hirskyi Tikych river to form the Tikych River, which soon (after just ) joins the Velyka Vys river to form the Syniukha river, which flows  to join the Southern Bug.

It was in the middle of the Battle of Korsun–Cherkassy, during World War II in February 1944.

References
 Географічна енциклопедія України: в 3-х томах / Редколегія: О. М. Маринич (відпов. ред.) та ін. — К.: «Українська радянська енциклопедія» імені М. П. Бажана, 1989.

Rivers of Cherkasy Oblast
Rivers of Kyiv Oblast